Chichester Central is an electoral ward of Chichester District, West Sussex, England and returns one member to sit on Chichester District Council.

Following a district boundary review, Chichester Central was created from the neighbouring wards of Chichester (East, North and South) in 2019.

Councillor

Election results

References

External links
 Chichester District Council
 Election Maps

Wards of Chichester District